Ben Zolinski (born 3 May 1992) is a German professional footballer who plays for 1. FC Kaiserslautern.

Career
In May 2016 Zolinski joined SC Paderborn 07 on a three-year contract from TSG Neustrelitz.

In September 2020, having been released by SC Paderborn upon the expiration of his contract in July, Zolinski moved to 2. Bundesliga side FC Erzgebirge Aue. He signed a three-year contract.

Style of play
Before his move to SC Paderborn, Zolinski was deployed as a right-back but then started playing as a striker.

References

External links
 
 

Living people
1992 births
German footballers
Footballers from Berlin
Association football fullbacks
Association football midfielders
Bundesliga players
2. Bundesliga players
3. Liga players
Regionalliga players
1. FC Neubrandenburg 04 players
FC Hansa Rostock players
FC Carl Zeiss Jena players
TSG Neustrelitz players
SC Paderborn 07 players
FC Erzgebirge Aue players
1. FC Kaiserslautern players